Galen Catholic College is a Roman Catholic co-educational high school located in Wangaratta, Victoria, Australia. The College is affiliated with the Association of Marist Schools of Australia.

History
The college was established in 1974, by the Marist Brothers, as Galen College, a senior campus (Yrs 11 and 12) for both male and female students. Most of its students came from the long-established St Joseph's Girls College and Champagnat Boys College, an agricultural boarding school; these two schools amalgamated and formed the current Galen College.

By 1983, Galen was operating as a full Year 7 -12, co-educational college.

Sport
The school is a member of the Catholic All Schools Sports Association (CAS).

The school today 
Galen Catholic College now caters for grades 7 to VCE/VCAL (11 and 12).

Notable alumni 
Daniel Andrews - Premier of Victoria
Baden Cooke - Retired Professional Cyclist
Chris Naish - Retired Professional Australian Rules Footballer
Ben Reid - Retired Professional Australian Rules Footballer
Sam Reid - Professional Australian Rules Footballer
Jarrad Waite - Retired Professional Australian Rules Footballer

See also 

 List of schools in Victoria
 List of high schools in Victoria

References

External links 
 Galen Catholic College Website

Wangaratta
Catholic secondary schools in Victoria (Australia)
Educational institutions established in 1887
Educational institutions established in 1974
1887 establishments in Australia
1974 establishments in Australia
Association of Marist Schools of Australia